The Dora Mavor Moore Award for Outstanding Direction of a Play/Musical is an annual award celebrating achievements in Toronto theatre.

Awards and nominations

References

External links
 Toronto Alliance for the Performing Arts - Doras

Dora Mavor Moore Awards